Clarke Mills or Vanity Fair Mills is a historic textile factory building in Jackson, Alabama.  It was designed in the Moderne style by H.B. Bieberstein.  The facility was completed in 1939 and was occupied by the Vanity Fair Corporation throughout much of its history.  Clarke Mills was added to the National Register of Historic Places on April 30, 1998.

References

National Register of Historic Places in Clarke County, Alabama
Industrial buildings and structures on the National Register of Historic Places in Alabama
Industrial buildings completed in 1939
Cotton mills in the United States